Chewacla State Park is a public recreation area in Auburn, Alabama, occupying  to the south of Interstate 85. The state park's central feature,  Lake Chewacla, provides opportunities for fishing, swimming, and non-motorized boating.

History
In the late nineteenth century, Wright's Mill occupied a site in the park where swimmers could find a place to splash about in the mill's surrounding pool. In the 1930s, workers with the Civilian Conservation Corps developed roads, foot trails, and park buildings. Their efforts can be seen in the park's stone cabins and arched masonry bridge. They also constructed the dam that created Chewacla Lake. The state took possession, opening the grounds as Chewacla State Park, in 1939.

Awards 
In September 2020, Chewacla State Park was one of eleven Alabama State Parks awarded Tripadvisor’s Traveler’s Choice Award, which recognizes businesses and attractions that earn consistently high user reviews.

Activities and amenities
In addition to water activities, the park features a system of trails for hiking and for mountain biking. Its trail system was designated as a National Recreation Trail in 2011. The park has facilities for RV and tent camping in addition to its renovated CCC–era cabins.

References

External links

Chewacla State Park Alabama Department of Conservation and Natural Resources

State parks of Alabama
Civilian Conservation Corps in Alabama
Protected areas of Lee County, Alabama
Landforms of Lee County, Alabama
Protected areas established in 1939
1939 establishments in Alabama
Alabama placenames of Native American origin
Mountain biking venues in Alabama
National Recreation Trails in Alabama